A National Olympic Committee (NOC) is a national constituent of the worldwide Olympic movement. Subject to the controls of the International Olympic Committee, NOCs are responsible for organizing their people's participation in the Olympic Games.  They may nominate cities within their respective areas as candidates for future Olympic Games. NOCs also promote the development of athletes and the training of coaches and officials at a national level within their geographies.

National Olympic Committees 
As of 2020, there are 206 National Olympic Committees. These include each of the 193 member states of the United Nations, one UN observer state (Palestine) and two states with limited recognition (Kosovo and Taiwan).

There are also ten dependent territories with recognized NOCs: four territories of the United States (American Samoa, Guam, Puerto Rico, and the United States Virgin Islands), three British Overseas Territories (Bermuda, the British Virgin Islands, and the Cayman Islands), one constituent country of the Kingdom of the Netherlands (Aruba), one associated state of New Zealand (the Cook Islands) and one special administrative region of China (Hong Kong).

Prior to 1996, rules for recognising dependent territories or constituent countries as separate countries within the IOC were not as strict as those within the United Nations, which allowed these territories to field teams separately from their sovereign state. Following an amendment to the Olympic Charter in 1996, NOC recognition can only be granted after recognition as an independent country by the international community. Since the rule does not apply retroactively, the dependent territories and constituent countries which were recognised before the rule change are allowed to continue sending separate teams to the Olympics, while the Faroe Islands and Macau send their own Paralympic teams.

The only state which thus qualifies to participate in the future is the Vatican City, a UN observer state. Niue, another associated state of New Zealand, could also be eligible for participation in the future as it conducts its own foreign relations and participates in several UN specialized agencies like other sovereign states. Currently, all other remaining states are ineligible to join the IOC as they are not recognised by a majority of the United Nations member countries. Constituent countries and dependent territories such as Curaçao, the Faroe Islands, Gibraltar, Macau and New Caledonia can also no longer be recognised, so athletes from these territories can only participate in the Olympics as part of their parent nation's national team. This rule also applies to territories experiencing a change in status – the Netherlands Antilles Olympic Committee was dissolved at the 123rd IOC session in July 2011 as the Netherlands Antilles ceased to exist in 2010.

For those countries and territories that are part of the Commonwealth of Nations, their National Olympic Committees also serve as the members of the Commonwealth Games Association. They are responsible for organising and overseeing their national teams at the Commonwealth Games.

Listed NOCs
This section lists the current:

 206 National Olympic Committees who are recognised by the International Olympic Committee, and so are the members of the Association of National Olympic Committees. 
 7 National Olympic Committees who are recognised by their continental Olympic associations, but are not recognised by the International Olympic Committee (Italics).

The ANOC members are eligible to enter the Olympic Games. Some National Olympic Committees who are members of a continental Olympic association but not ANOC members compete in continental-level and subregional-level tournaments. These committees, however, are not allowed to participate in the Olympic Games.

The five continental Olympic associations are:

 Africa – Association of National Olympic Committees of Africa (ANOCA)
 America – Pan American Sports Organization (PASO)
 Asia – Olympic Council of Asia (OCA)
 Europe – European Olympic Committees (EOC)
 Oceania – Oceania National Olympic Committees (ONOC)

The IOC runs the Summer Olympic Games and the Winter Olympic Games as competitions in which all IOC-recognised NOCs can participate. Each continent also runs its own championships for their members:

 ANOCA – African Games
 PASO – Pan American Games and Pan American Winter Games
 OCA – Asian Games and Asian Winter Games
 EOC – European Games
 ONOC – Pacific Games

While not continental unions in themselves, the Union of Arab National Olympic Committees (UANOC) and International Committee of Mediterranean Games (CIJM) organise multi-sport events between Arabic-speaking countries and Mediterranean countries respectively. All 22 National Olympic Committees that form the UANOC and the 26 from CIJM are also members of either the ANOCA, EOC or OCA and are eligible to send their athletes to either the African, European or Asian Games. National Olympic Committees from the UANOC and CIJM are noted in the list below.

Africa (ANOCA) 

1: National Olympic Committee is a member of the UANOC.
2: National Olympic Committee is a member of the CIJM.

Americas (Panam Sports) 

1: National Olympic Committee is suspended by the IOC

Asia (OCA) 

1: National Olympic Committee is a member of the UANOC.
2: National Olympic Committee is a member of the OCA but not an ANOC member.
3: Official name used by the IOC, ANOC and OCA for the  Republic of China (Taiwan).
4: National Olympic Committee is a member of the CIJM.

Europe (EOC) 

1: Israel was a member of the OCA, but left the organisation in 1981. It joined the EOC in 1994.
2: National Olympic Committee is a member of the CIJM.

Oceania (ONOC) 

1: National Olympic Committee is an associate member of the ONOC but not an ANOC member.

Notes

Divisions
The NOCs are all members of the Association of National Olympic Committees (ANOC), which is also split among five continental associations:

See the article for each continental association for the complete lists of all NOCs.

Unrecognized National Olympic Committees
The Faroe Islands and Macau both have recognized National Paralympic Committees and compete at the Paralympic Games. However, neither territory's National Olympic Committee is recognized by the IOC, so they cannot participate in the Olympics. Macau remains recognized by the Olympic Council of Asia and takes part in the Asian Games.

Other existing countries/regions with unrecognized Olympic committees: Catalonia, Gibraltar, French Polynesia, Niue, Somaliland, New Caledonia, Kurdistan, Northern Cyprus, Abkhazia, Native Americans, the Northern Mariana Islands, Anguilla, Montserrat, Transnistria and Turks & Caicos Islands.

South Ossetia intends to establish a National Olympic Committee, and representatives from the Republic of Artsakh take part in Armenia's National Olympic Committee.

Olympic Sport

Association of IOC Recognised International Sports Federations

See also
National Paralympic Committee
List of IOC country codes
District of Columbia Olympic Committee
Commonwealth Games Association

Notes

References

Citations

Sources 

 
Association of National Olympic Committees website

External links